Miftah Anwar Sani (born 19 November 1995) is an Indonesian professional footballer who plays as a left-back for Liga 1 club Dewa United.

Club career

Persita Tangerang
Sani signed with Persita Tangerang to play in the Indonesian Liga 1 for the 2020 season. This season was suspended on 27 March 2020 due to the COVID-19 pandemic. The season was abandoned and was declared void on 20 January 2021.

Sloboda Tuzla
On 16 February 2021, he signed a one-year contract with Bosnian Premier League club Sloboda Tuzla. However, Miftah in May 2021 decided to cease the contract and return to Indonesia without playing a single match after failing to earn a work permit.

Barito Putera
He signed a contract to play for Liga 1 club Barito Putera in the 2021 Liga 1 season. Miftah made his league debut on 11 September 2021 in a match against Bali United at the Indomilk Arena, Tangerang.

Dewa United
Miftah was signed for Dewa United to play in Liga 1 in the 2022–23 season. He made his league debut on 25 July 2022 in a match against Persis Solo at the Moch. Soebroto Stadium, Magelang.

International career
He made his official international debut on 7 October 2021, against Chinese Taipei in a 2023 AFC Asian Cup qualification – Play-off Round match.

Career statistics

Club

Notes

International

References

External links
Miftah Anwar Sani at Liga Indonesia

1995 births
Living people
Indonesian footballers
Indonesia international footballers
Association football fullbacks
Liga 1 (Indonesia) players
Liga 2 (Indonesia) players
Premier League of Bosnia and Herzegovina players
Persikabo 1973 players
PPSM Magelang players
Badak Lampung F.C. players
Persita Tangerang players
FK Sloboda Tuzla players
PS Barito Putera players
Dewa United F.C. players
Indonesian expatriate footballers
Expatriate footballers in Bosnia and Herzegovina
Indonesian expatriate sportspeople in Bosnia and Herzegovina
People from Salatiga
Sportspeople from Central Java